Amphiagrion is a genus of damselflies in the family Coenagrionidae. The males are bright red with some black; the females are duller. The genus is confined to North America.

The genus contains the following species:
Amphiagrion abbreviatum  - Western Red Damsel
Amphiagrion saucium  - Eastern Red Damsel

References

Coenagrionidae
Zygoptera genera
Taxa named by Edmond de Sélys Longchamps